The 1996–97 California Golden Bears men's basketball team represented the University of California, Berkeley in the 1996–97 season.

Led by head coach Ben Braun, the Bears finished the regular season with a 12–6 record in the Pac-10, placing them in a tie for second. The Bears would receive an at-large bid into the NCAA tournament where they would make a run to the Sweet Sixteen. The Golden Bears defeated Princeton and Villanova before falling to North Carolina in the East Regional semifinal. The team finished the season with an overall record of 23–9.

Roster

Schedule and results

|-
!colspan=9 style=| Regular season

|-
!colspan=9 style=| NCAA Tournament

Rankings

Team players drafted into the NBA

References

California Golden Bears men's basketball seasons
California
California
California Golden Bear
California Golden Bear